Marty Larsen (May 9, 1905 – June 11, 1988) was a member of the Wisconsin State Assembly.

Biography
Larsen was born on May 9, 1905 in Oconto, Wisconsin. He graduated from Milwaukee State College. During the World War II era, he served in the United States Coast Guard from 1940 to 1942. He was a school teacher and a building manager. Larsen died on June 11, 1988 in Milwaukee, Wisconsin of cancer.

Political career
Larsen was elected to the Wisconsin State Assembly in 1956 and 1958. Additionally, he was Supervisor of Milwaukee County, Wisconsin from 1940 to 1956. He was a Democrat.

References

1905 births
1988 deaths
People from Oconto, Wisconsin
People from Milwaukee County, Wisconsin
County supervisors in Wisconsin
Military personnel from Wisconsin
United States Coast Guard personnel
University of Wisconsin–Milwaukee alumni
20th-century American politicians
Democratic Party members of the Wisconsin State Assembly